Ispán ("count") is the Hungarian title of a number of officials in the Kingdom of Hungary.

It may refer to:
 ispán, the head (usually appointed by the monarch) of a castle district (a fortress and the royal lands attached to it) or an administrative unit called county;
 the head of autonomous ethnic groups within the kingdom, including
 the székelyispán or Count of the Székelys, the royal officials leading the Hungarian-speaking Székely community in Transylvania (now in Romania) in the Middle Ages,
 the szebeni ispán or Count Hermannstadt (Nagyszeben, Sibiu), the head of the Transylvanian Saxons between 1224 and 1324.

See also
 County (Kingdom of Hungary)
 Župa